True Golf Classics: Wicked 18 is a golfing video game originally released in 1993 for the Super NES. A version was later released for the  3DO Interactive Multiplayer and the Mega Drive. The game takes place on a very difficult otherworldly golf course. It is part of T&E Soft's True Golf Classics series, but unlike other games in the series which portray actual golf courses such as Pebble Beach and Waialae Country Club, Wicked 18 portrays an entirely fictitious golf course.

Gameplay

The object is to guide the golf ball through nearly impossible obstacles (lava, statues, extremely steep hills and mountains, omnipresent water hazards, huge sand traps, floating chunks of earth, gorges, cement) as the player tries to score as low as possible in order to win the day. Using the caddie, it is possible to scan the situation before hitting the ball with an analyzer. The bunkers are extremely treacherous, there is lava as well as water hazards, and 'out of bounds' can be in the middle of the hole. The "out of bounds" area could either be a platform game-style pit, an extended area of sand, or simply an unplayable rift. The game offers stroke play, match play, or tournament play.

There are also four caddies that help them. Each of them has their own personality and opinions about certain areas of each hole.

Reception
Next Generation reviewed the Saturn version of the game, rating it three stars out of five, and stated that "In the end, if you're looking for a fresh approach to video golf this may be your only alternative, and it's a pretty good one."

Reviews
Electronic Games (Jan, 1994)
Digital Press (May, 1995)
Mean Machines (May, 1996)
Game Zero (Dec, 1995)
Electric Playground (Apr 22, 1996)
Computer and Video Games (Jul, 1996)

Notes

References

External links
 Devil's Course at Uvlist
 True Golf Classics: Wicked 18 at MobyGames

1993 video games
3DO Interactive Multiplayer games
Blue Planet Software games
Golf video games
NEC PC-9801 games
Sega Genesis games
Super Nintendo Entertainment System games
T&E Soft games
Video games developed in Japan
Multiplayer and single-player video games